Independent Diplomat is a non-profit non-governmental organisation founded in 2004 by British former diplomat Carne Ross to give advice and assistance in diplomatic strategy and technique to governments and political groups. It provides diplomatic advice to unrecognised governments and small nations, and works towards greater participation in diplomatic forums.

History
Independent Diplomat's philosophy is informed by Carne Ross' experience at the United Nations Security Council, most notably the "very obvious imbalance [...] between the diplomatic resources and skills of the powerful countries, and everyone else. In his book Independent Diplomat, Dispatches from an Unaccountable Elite (2007), Ross argued that the "numerous smaller UN missions struggle to cover the enormous and proliferating agendas of the UN General Assembly, Security Council and specialised committees with just one or two horribly overworked and under-equipped diplomats."

Work
Independent Diplomat is based in New York. Its staff includes former diplomats from various counties. In 2009, its annual budget was $1.8 million; revenue came from foundation donations, government donations, and client fees. Contributors included George Soros and the Oak Foundation. Independent Diplomat charges clients according to their ability to pay, with some clients paying only nominal fees.

The group is a nonprofit providing diplomatic advisory services, sometimes called "freelance diplomacy." Carne Ross, the group founder, has argued for broader participation of small countries in United Nations institutions. 

Independent Diplomat's clients have included breakaway states, unrecognized states, governments-in-exile and island micronations, particularly those who "would otherwise struggle to make their voices heard in the corridors of power of Brussels, New York and Washington."  The group has worked on behalf of recognized states such as the Marshall Islands (in climate change talks affecting the island nation), Croatia (supporting the latter's accession to the European Union), and Kosovo (supporting the 2008 Kosovo declaration of independence).  The group also did work on behalf of Aung San Suu Kyi's Burmese government in exile; Somaliland (seeking independence from Somalia), the Polisario Front of Western Sahara (seeking independence from Morocco) and the Turkish Republic of Northern Cyprus (as the Turkish-occupied territory engaged in talks with the internationally recognized Greek Cypriot government).

Ross, the group's founder, says that the organization declines to provide services to clients who "are engaged in armed conflicts, are insufficiently committed to human rights, democracy and international law, or unwilling to commit to negotiated settlements to their problems." Ross told the Associated Press: "We advise would-be countries, but also regular states where we can add our own expertise to theirs, as long as they are democratic countries that respect international law."

References 

Diplomacy
Organizations established in 2004
International diplomatic organizations